Calliotropis persculpta is a species of sea snail, a marine gastropod mollusk in the family Eucyclidae.

Description

The shell can grow up to be 10 mm.

Distribution
This marine species occurs off South Africa

References

 Vilvens C. (2007) New records and new species of Calliotropis from Indo-Pacific. Novapex 8 (Hors Série 5): 1–72

External links
 

persculpta
Gastropods described in 1903